Cliff Evans (born 1977) is an American multidisciplinary artist of Australian origin.

Biography 
Evans was born in New South Wales in Australia. He grew up in East Texas. He received his BFA from the School of the Museum of Fine Arts in Boston. Evans lives and works in Arbutus and Baltimore.

Exhibitions

Solo 
 2006 "The Road to Mount Weather," curated by Pieranna Cavalchini, Location One, New York, NY
 2007 "Cliff Evans: The Road to Mount Weather," curated by Chris Coleman, University of Oregon, Eugene, OR
 2007 “Cliff Evans: Empyrean,” curated by Pieranna Cavalchini, Isabella Stewart Gardner Museum, Boston, MA 
 2008 “Empyrean,”curated by Stephan Stoyanob, Luxe Gallery, New York, NY.
 2008 “Empyrean,” curated by Jason Hughes and Andrea Pollan, The Library, Baltimore, MD
 2008 “The Road to Mount Weather,” curated by Cory Knedler, The University of South Dakota, Vermillion, SD
 2008 “The Road to Mount Weather,” curated by Andrea Pollan, Curator’s Office
 2009 “Empyrean,” curated by Jacqueline Ehlis, Stephan Stoyanov Gallery, New York, NY
 2010 “Citizen,” curated by Stephan Stoyanov, Myhren Gallery, University of Denver, Denver, CO 
 2010 “Citizen,” curated by Christopher Coleman, Laleh Mehran, Dan Jacobs. The Stamp Gallery, University of Maryland, College Park, MD
 2012 “Sites and Stations,” curated by Jason Hughes
 2012 “Drones in the Garden,” curated by Andrea Pollan, Curator’s Office, Washington, DC

Group 
2013 “Moving Image: London,” Andrea Pollan & Curator’s Office Bargehouse, London, UK

Awards 

 Best Experimental Film, Museum School Film & Video Annual, 2003
 Deans Discretionary Fund, Museum School, 2003
 Princess Grace Award Nomination, 2004
 5th Year Traveling Scholar, Museum School, 2004
 Charles Amos Cummings Memorial Scholarship, Museum School, 2004
 Clarissa Bartlett Scholarship, Museum School, 2004
 Artforum's Top 10 Artist Films for 2006 as picked by MOMA curator Barbara London
 Younger Than Jesus: Artist Directory, New Museum, Phaidon, 2009
 Premio Giovani Collezionisti Prize - Finalist, ROMA, 2010

References

External links 

1977 births
Living people
American photographers
School of the Museum of Fine Arts at Tufts alumni